Razer Inc. is an American-Singaporean multinational technology company that designs, develops, and sells consumer electronics, financial services, and gaming hardware. The company was founded in 1998 by Min-Liang Tan and Robert "RazerGuy" Krakoff. It is dual headquartered in the one-north subzone of Queenstown, Singapore, and Irvine, California, US.

History 
Razer began as a San Diego, California-based subsidiary of kärna LLC in 1998, created to develop and market a high-end computer gaming mouse, the Boomslang, targeted to computer gamers. Kärna ceased operations in 2000 due to poor financial issues. The current iteration of Razer was founded in 2005 by Min-Liang Tan, a Singaporean NUS graduate, and Robert Krakoff after they procured the rights to the Razer brand following a large investment from Hong Kong tycoon Li Ka-shing and Singaporean holding company Temasek Holdings.

Razer bought the software assets of the Android-based microconsole Ouya from its parent company Ouya Inc. on 27 July 2015, while the hardware was discontinued. Ouya's technical team joined Razer's team in developing their own microconsole, which was called the Forge TV. It was discontinued in 2016.

In October 2016, Razer purchased THX from Creative Technology according to THX CEO Ty Ahmad-Taylor.

In January 2017, Razer bought manufacturer Nextbit, the startup behind the Robin smartphone. Shortly after in November that, Razer unveiled the Razer Phone, its first smartphone whose design is based on that of the Robin.

In July 2017, Razer filed to go public through an IPO in Hong Kong. In October, it was confirmed that Razer plans to offer 1,063,600,000 shares at a range of $0.38–$0.51. On 14 November, Razer was officially listed on Hong Kong stock exchange under the stock code 1337, a reference to leet speak commonly used by gamers. Razer's IPO closed 18% up on the first day of trading and was the 2nd most successful IPO of 2017 in Hong Kong.

In April 2018, Razer announced that it was planning to fully acquire the e-payments platform MOL for about $61 million. In July, Razer made its debut in Malaysia by launching an e-wallet service called Razer Pay. They also announced the Razer Phone 2 in October.

On 21 December 2018, Razer announced its new seven-storey South-east Asia headquarters in the one-north subzone of Queenstown, Singapore. The building was expected to be ready by 2020, with Boustead Projects' joint venture firm constructing it. The exterior would be lit with LED strips representing a central processing unit in operation. Razer held its ground-breaking ceremony on 22 February 2019, with a new digital real estate start-up called Echo Base launched the same day. 600 more staff were planned over the next few years, adding to the 400 staff based then. The first smart city project in the region would be developed soon.

In February 2019, Razer announced it was closing its Razer Game Store as part of the company's realignment plans.

On 21 May 2019, Razer released a statement that announced that Ouya online accounts and services would be discontinued on 25 June 2019. According to Razer, most apps will become unusable on the platform, many relying on the user accounts to work. Razer suggests that users may be able to transfer purchases to other storefront platforms like Google Play if developers and publishers agree to such.

In May 2020, Razer announced the Razer Health initiative, sponsoring high-quality certified surgical masks to governments, healthcare organizations, and individuals around the world.

In October 2020, Razer announced it was launching a new virtual prepaid debit card starting with Singapore in January 2021.

In 2021, Razer announced the shutting down of Razer Pay (Beta) e-wallet in Malaysia and Singapore.

In February 2021, CEO Tan Min-Liang announced that Razer will move its Singapore headquarters to a much larger building that would open in the second quarter of 2021. Razer planned to hire up to 1,000 positions for the new headquarters. The headquarters officially opened on 26 October 2021, which was officiated by Deputy Prime Minister of Singapore Heng Swee Keat at the ceremony. The building consisted of a "RazerStore" and a "RazerCafe".

On 26 April 2022, cofounder Robert Krakoff died; as of 12 May 2022, no cause of death has been confirmed from the company or his family.

In May 2022, Razer delisted from the Hong Kong Stock Exchange.

Products 

Razer's products are generally targeted at gamers and include gaming laptops, gaming tablets, and PC peripherals such as mice, audio devices, keyboards, mouse mats, and gamepads. Razer has also released a VOIP software called Razer Comms. The Razer DeathAdder gaming mouse is the company's most popular product by sales numbers. Razer mice are used by around 5% of professional gamers. Most Razer products are named after predatory or venomous animals, ranging from snakes (mice), insects (mouse mats), arachnids (keyboards), marine creatures (audio), and felines (console peripherals). The exceptions to this are the Razer Blade series of laptops and Razer Edge, which are instead named after bladed objects. Razer announced its first gaming smartphone, the Razer Phone, in November 2017, which marked the company's first steps into the smartphone business.

In May 2020, Razer has begun distributing free masks via vending machines in Singapore. Each person can receive one mask by authenticating with Razer Pay. The masks are manufactured in Singapore.

In January 2021, Razer launched a range of high-grade designer masks as part of the company's initiative, Project Hazel, in a move to encourage more people to wear masks due to the COVID-19 pandemic. The mask is designed to allow lip-reading by seeing facial cues when people talk, with LED lights to illuminate the wearer's face in dark environments. The same year, it also entered the gaming chair market with the Iskur, an in-house designed chair for gaming.  More recently, they have introduced the Enki, a chair marketed for "all day gaming" and comfort. In 2021, Razer introduces new 8 kHz "HyperPolling" technology to power the Razer Viper 8K, the world's fastest gaming mouse.

In April 2022, Razer partnered with the deep learning company Lambda to launch its first Linux oriented laptop, Tensorbook, which targeted machine learning engineers.

See also 

 Keyboard technology
 List of financial services companies
 List of mechanical keyboards
 Open Source Virtual Reality (OSVR)

References

External links 

 

 
1998 establishments in California
American companies established in 1998
Singaporean companies established in 1998
Computer peripheral companies
Consumer electronics brands
Electronics companies established in 1998
Electronics companies of the United States
Companies based in Irvine, California
Computer hardware companies
Electronics companies of Singapore
Video game companies of Singapore
Companies of Singapore
Video game hardware
Companies formerly listed on the Hong Kong Stock Exchange
2017 initial public offerings
Singaporean brands
Mobile phone manufacturers
Payment service providers